Claremont School may refer to:

Colleges and universities
Claremont Colleges, in Claremont, California
Claremont McKenna College
Claremont Graduate University
Claremont School of Theology, Claremont, California

Primary and secondary schools
Claremont High School (California)
Clairemont High School, Clairemont Mesa, San Diego, California
Claremont High School Historic District, on the National Register of Historic Places in Catawba County, North Carolina
Claremont School, Baltimore, a special needs day school
Claremont High School (Cape Town), South Africa
Claremont High School (Tasmania), Australia
Claremont High School, Kenton, London, England
Claremont High School, East Kilbride, South Lanarkshire, Scotland
Claremont Fan Court School, Esher, in Surrey, United Kingdom
Claremont Secondary School, Saanich, British Columbia

See also
Claremont High School (disambiguation)